Winthrop is a city in Little River County, Arkansas, United States. The population was 192 at the 2010 census. The community was a backdrop for the Winthrop Rockefeller election campaigns in the 1960s.

Geography
Winthrop is located in northwestern Little River County at  (33.830750, -94.354330).

Demographics

As of the census of 2000, there were 186 people, 71 households, and 52 families residing in the city. The racial makeup of the city was 90.86% White, 2.69% Black or African American, 2.69% Native American, 0.54% from other races, and 3.23% from two or more races.  2.15% of the population were Hispanic or Latino of any race.

There were 71 households, out of which 32.4% had children under the age of 18 living with them, 69.0% were married couples living together, 2.8% had a female householder with no husband present, and 25.4% were non-families. 25.4% of all households were made up of individuals, and 14.1% had someone living alone who was 65 years of age or older.  The average household size was 2.62 and the average family size was 3.13.

In the city, the population was spread out, with 28.0% under the age of 18, 8.6% from 18 to 24, 29.0% from 25 to 44, 24.2% from 45 to 64, and 10.2% who were 65 years of age or older.  The median age was 32 years. For every 100 females, there were 95.8 males.  For every 100 females age 18 and over, there were 100.0 males.

The median income for a household in the city was $25,313, and the median income for a family was $31,094. Males had a median income of $22,188 versus $17,917 for females. The per capita income for the city was $13,474.  About 14.3% of families and 16.7% of the population were below the poverty line, including 15.6% of those under the age of eighteen and 9.1% of those 65 or over.

Education
The Horatio School District serves Winthrop. On July 1, 1992, the Winthrop School District consolidated into the Horatio district.

Notable person
Marshall Wright, Democratic member of the Arkansas House of Representatives for St. Francis County in eastern Arkansas, formerly resided in Winthrop.

References

Cities in Little River County, Arkansas
Cities in Arkansas